Joel Nelson is a cowboy poet.

He is a recipient of a 2009 National Heritage Fellowship awarded by the National Endowment for the Arts, which is the United States government's highest honor in the folk and traditional arts.

References

National Heritage Fellowship winners
Living people
American male poets
Cowboy poets
Year of birth missing (living people)